Jason Jung was the defending champion but chose not to defend his title.

Lu Yen-hsun won the title after defeating Evgeny Donskoy 6–3, 6–4 in the final.

Seeds

Draw

Finals

Top half

Bottom half

References
Main Draw
Qualifying Draw

Chengdu Challenger - Singles
2017 Singles